Burak Can Çamoğlu (born 5 October 1996) is a Turkish professional footballer who plays for Adanaspor. He made his debut in the German 3. Liga on 3 February 2015.

References

External links
 
 
 
 

1996 births
People from Kamen
Sportspeople from Arnsberg (region)
Footballers from North Rhine-Westphalia
German people of Turkish descent
Living people
Turkish footballers
Turkey youth international footballers
German footballers
Association football midfielders
Borussia Dortmund II players
Karlsruher SC players
Hatayspor footballers
Adanaspor footballers
3. Liga players
Regionalliga players
2. Bundesliga players
Süper Lig players
TFF First League players